Paul Mus (1902–1969) was a French writer and scholar. His studies focused on Viet Nam and other South-East Asian cultures.

He was born in Bourges to an academic family, and grew up in northern Viet Nam (Tonkin). In 1907 his father opened the College de Protectorate in Hanoi and he would graduate from the college some 12 years later.

At the outbreak of World War II he was serving as a platoon commander leading a colonial unit in combat at Valvin and Sully-sur-Loire for which he would be awarded the Croix de Guerre. In 1942 he joined the Free French Forces in Africa. He trained with British commandos in Ceylon in 1944–1945 and then in January 1945 he was parachuted into Tonkin to rally French and Vietnamese to the Free French cause. He was in Hanoi on 9 March when the Japanese overthrew the Vichy French administration and he then escaped the city and walked  to join up with French colonial forces retreating into southern China.

In 1947, Mus became the political advisor to Émile Bollaert, the new French High Commissioner of Indochina. On 10 May 1947 Bollaert dispatched Mus to make contact with Ho Chi Minh and after walking  through Viet Minh held territory he arrived at Ho's headquarters on May 12, 1947. Mus had been authorised to offer Ho a ceasefire on three conditions: 1. the Viet Minh were to lay down their weapons, 2. French troops were to be allowed to circulate freely in areas held by them and 3. all French Foreign Legion deserters held by the Viet Minh were to be returned to French control. Ho refused the offer commenting "In the French Union there is no place for cowards, if I accepted these conditions I would be one."

He later served as a professor at both the Collège de France and Yale University. He wrote widely on Buddhism and comparative linguistics. He was deeply affected by the death of his son Émile Mus in 1961 during the Algerian War.

He was interviewed in the 1968 documentary film In the Year of the Pig. Mus is survived by a daughter, Laurence Émilie Rimer (née Mus); his son-in-law, J. Thomas Rimer, is also a scholar of Asia, specializing in Japanese literature and drama.

References

1902 births
1969 deaths
French sociologists
Linguists from France
Historical linguists
French Army personnel of World War II
French male writers
Vietnamologists
20th-century linguists
20th-century French male writers
Free French military personnel of World War II
French people in colonial Vietnam